Uday Reddy is the founder and CEO of Yupp TV, an internet-only television platform for Indians living abroad. Before founding Yupp TV in 2006,  he served as a Director for Nortel.

Uday Reddy was born Udaynandan Reddy in a small village of Veenavanka near Hanamkonda town in Telangana, India. He did most of his high school at Government Junior College in Hanamkonda. He studied engineering in electronics and telecommunication at Delhi College of Engineering, acquiring a BE degree. He eventually also pursued an executive MBA program in finance from Kellogg School of Management.

Career 
Uday Reddy founded Yupp TV in 2007 to create an over-the-top (OTT) content provider of South Asian content and has more than 250 live TV channels. In September 2020, Reddy also founded Turito Inc which is a live learning platform for the preparation of exams such as SAT, ACT, AP, etc.

Philanthropy 
Uday Reddy created the Modern Village Vision 2020 that began its work in the same year in Reddy's birthplace Veenavanka village in Telangana and works in the field of healthcare and education.

References 

Living people
People from Telangana